This is a list of stars with proplyds (ionized protoplanetary discs) and includes whether they have gaps or planets.

Lists of proplyds

List of proplyds with gaps
(list is very incomplete) 
When planets are confirmed (if no planet before), please move to the List of extrasolar planets

List of proplyds without gaps
(list is very incomplete)

List of extremes

This list contains the largest, smallest, oldest, youngest.
(list is very incomplete)

List of firsts
This list contains firsts.
(list is very incomplete)

See also
 Hypothetical astronomical object
 List of exoplanet extremes
 Lists of astronomical objects
 Lists of exoplanets

References

External links
 SpaceDaily: NASA's Spitzer Digs Up Troves of Possible Solar Systems in Orion Aug 17, 2006

Proplyds
+
Stars with proplyds